Shirinu (also Romanized as Shīrīnū, Shīrīnnū, Shīrīno, and Shirinoo) is a village in Taheri Rural District of the Central District of Kangan County, Bushehr province, Iran. At the 2006 census, its population was 1,160 in 266 households. The following census in 2011 counted 3,441 people in 689 households. The latest census in 2016 showed a population of 9,976 people in 1,087 households; it was the largest village in its rural district.

References 

Populated places in Kangan County